Alberto Acereda is a Spanish former professor who currently works as Associate Vice President in the Global Higher Education Division at Educational Testing Service (ETS) in Princeton, New Jersey. He provides overall leadership for business development initiatives and academic outreach in global and higher education. Previously at ETS he worked as Senior Director of Business Development and as senior strategic advisor to the Vice President and COO of higher education. Prior to joining ETS in 2012, he spent nearly twenty years at various universities and graduate programs across the United States.

He was a professor of Spanish and Latin American literatures and cultures and the chair of the Department of Spanish and Portuguese at the "School of International Letters and Cultures" at Arizona State University, (United States), where he also served as director of graduate studies. He was also a member of the ASU Provost's executive committee and the president of the Senate of the College of Liberal Arts and Sciences at Arizona State University and was named Dean's Fellow in the same college. He is also member of the North American Academy of the Spanish Language ("Academia Norteamericana de la Lengua Española"), a branch of the Real Academia Española and the author of several articles and op-eds in European and American newspapers. While he continues to be a faculty affiliate at Arizona State University's Hispanic Research Center, he has also been a visiting professor at the University of Pennsylvania.

Biography

Early life 
Alberto Acereda was born in Calahorra, La Rioja, Spain in 1965. He studied at the La Salle School, in Tarragona, Spain. He graduated in Hispanic philology at the University of Barcelona. He obtained a master's degree in Spanish literature and a doctorate in Spanish and Latin American literature (University of Georgia, US).

Career as a university professor 
For nearly twenty years, he was a professor of Spanish and Latin American literatures (with particular emphasis on the fin de siècle, modernismo and modernity within transatlantic literary and cultural studies), former director of graduate studies in the "School of International Letters and Cultures" at Arizona State University (US), where he was also the chair of the Department of Spanish and Portuguese. He was named to Dean's Faculty Fellow. He was also a faculty affiliate in the program of Jewish studies, and he was also the director and founder of the ASU Study Abroad Program at the University of Alicante (Spain). He has been a visiting professor at the Universidad Menéndez y Pelayo, at the Universidad de Alicante, and the University of Pennsylvania.

Career in higher education 
At Arizona State University he worked at the College of Liberal Arts and Sciences and received significant experience with curriculum policy, development, and program review. He led a top undergraduate and graduate academic unit at Arizona State University and also directed several other graduate programs within the School of International Letters and Cultures and working directly with the dean of the College of Liberal Arts and Sciences, the dean of the graduate college, and the provost office. He also led projects on academic excellence for faculty in the midst of an innovative model in higher education called the "New American University." He was part of several university-wide curriculum and academic policy committees, such as the Tenure and Promotion Review, the Curriculum and Academic Programs and others. Acereda was also the president of the Faculty Academic Senate in the largest college at Arizona State. His current work at ETS deals with the larger picture and the possible solutions to the challenges currently faced in higher education in the United States and globally. At ETS, Acereda explores the changing directions in undergraduate and graduate education, the importance of faculty support and development, strategic planning and all the issues related to academic program review and its links to student learning outcomes and college success.

Studies on Hispanic Modernism and Rubén Dario 
He has made important scholarly contributions to Hispanic literary modernism and has done extensive research on the end of the 19th century Hispanic. In this area, Acereda has studied the figure of the Nicaraguan poet Rubén Darío, writing several scholarly books such as Ruben Dario and the Poetics of Despair and Rubén Darío, poeta trágico. He has also coordinated and compiled several papers on this modernist author, such as his work The Other Centennial (El otro centenario): Rubén Darío y "Cantos de vida y esperanza" (Rubén Darío and "Songs of Life and Hope"), published in 2005 or "Homenaje a Rubén Darío." He also wrote two volumes of English translations of the poetry of Rubén Darío, prepared with U.S. researcher Professor Will Derusha: Songs of Life and Hope. Rubén Darío, and Selected Poems of Rubén Darío. A Bilingual Anthology. In 2005 he received the "International Rubén Darío Research Award" from the Universidad Nacional Autónoma de Nicaragua and he was also honored with the "Distinguished Research Recognition" by the "Nicaraguan Institute of Hispanic Culture" at the Embassy of Spain in Nicaragua, and by the "Nicaraguan Royal Academy of the Spanish Language".

Other areas of literature 
In other areas of literature, Acereda has published extensively and his research has appeared in different research journals around the world. He is also the author of two books on other areas of Hispanic literary historiography: The Marquesa de Fuerte-Hijar. A Writer of the Enlightenment and The Poetic Language of Miguel Hernández). His most recent books include: Rubén Darío y el proyecto liberal modernista (2012); El antimodernismo. Debates transatlánticos en el fin de siglo (2011); Modernism, Rubén Darío and the Poetics of Despair (2004); La Marquesa de Fuerte-Híjar. Una dramaturga de la Ilustración. (2000). He is also the author of six book editions related to modernista authors that appeared in Hiperión, Visor, Sudamericana and other important publishers. He is also the author of two book translations of Darío's poetry (Duke UP and Bucknell UP), and four edited monographs on Modernism and Dario.

He has published over eighty scholarly articles in refereed journals such as Insula, Revista de Literatura (CSIC), Revista de Filología Románica, Romance Notes, Bulletin of Spanish Studies, Romance Quarterly, Hispanófila, Cuadernos Americanos, Hispania, Anales de Literatura Hispanoamericana, Hispanic Journal, Hispanófila, Dieciocho... He has authored multiple book reviews, several book chapters and encyclopedia entries. Acereda serves on the editorial board of several scholarly journals and is the editor of Journal of Hispanic Modernism and its literary review "Magazine Modernista". He has evaluated book manuscripts for university presses at ivy league institutions and sits on several editorial boards. He has conducted funded research in Nicaragua, Spain and England, and has been an invited honorary program director for the Universidad Internacional Menéndez Pelayo in Santander (Spain) (2008).

Apart from his profession and his university and literary research and teaching, Acereda is also general editor of two magazines dedicated to the fin de siecle Transatlantic Modernism: the digital magazine Magazine Modernista and Journal of Hispanic Modernism, review of research on Modernism. Some of his publications focus on textual representation of social and political issues, human rights, and ideology. His current research concerns the intersection of literature, journalism and politics and the social space in Modern Latin America and Spain. His broad research interests are in literary studies and comparative representations of spirituality and the politics of text within the Hispanic world. His research uses a strong philological and theoretical background to expand his literary and cultural analysis of texts as a product of humanistic, anthropological and social constructs. He has done extensive research on the connections of literature and social politics in the Hispanic world. Acereda has written extensively on Latin American and Spanish poetics, its connections to social issues such as human rights and he has held teaching appointments in Spain and the United States.

Books and editions published
 Modernism, Rubén Darío and the Poetics of Despair
 Rubén Darío: Poeta trágico. Una nueva visión (Ruben Dario: tragic poet. A new vision)
 El Modernismo poético. Estudio crítico y antología temática (Poetic Modernism. Critical study and thematic anthology)
 Poemas filosóficos de Rubén Darío (Philosophical poems of Rubén Darío)
 Una sed de ilusiones infinita (An endless thirst for dreams)
 Poesía erótica de Rubén Darío (Erotic poetry of Ruben Dario)
 Poesía selecta de Rubén Darío (Poetry of Rubén Darío selected)
 Antología poética de Rubén Darío (Anthology poetry of Ruben Dario)
 Dossier Rubén Darío
 Homenaje a Rubén Darío (Tribute to Ruben Dario)
 El otro centenario: Rubén Darío y "Cantos de vida y esperanza" (The other anniversary: Rubén Darío and "Songs of Life and Hope")
 Songs of Life and Hope. Cantos de vida y esperanza. Rubén Darío
 Selected Poems of Rubén Darío. A Bilingual Anthology
 La Marquesa de Fuerte-Híjar. Una dramaturga de la Ilustración (The Marquesa de Fuerte-Hijar. A playwright of the Enlightenment)
 El lenguaje poético de Miguel Hernández. El rayo que no cesa (The poetic language of Miguel Hernandez. The ray that does not stop).

References

External links
 http://www.albertoacereda.org 
 https://www.academia.edu/AlbertoAcereda
 http://www.magazinemodernista.com
 http://www.journal-hispanic-modernism.org

1965 births
People from Calahorra
Spanish academics
Spanish writers in the United States
Living people
Spanish emigrants to the United States
Arizona State University faculty